The Birth may refer to:

 The Birth (The Cosby Show), an episode of The Cosby Show
 The Birth (album), an album by Stardeath and White Dwarfs
 The Birth (EP), an EP by Rasco

See also
 Birth (disambiguation)